Herbertsville is an unincorporated community located within Brick Township in Ocean County, New Jersey, United States. The suburban community is located in the northern reaches of the township centered about the intersection of Herbertsville Road (County Route 549 Spur) and Lanes Mill Road.

References

Brick Township, New Jersey
Unincorporated communities in Ocean County, New Jersey
Unincorporated communities in New Jersey